Eagle Peak is a mountain peak located in San Bernardino County, California.

See also
Sacramento Mountains

References

Mountains of San Bernardino County, California
Mountains of Southern California